Prossy Akampurira Mbabazi (born 8 December 1987) is a Ugandan politician and woman member of parliament. In 2016, she was elected as a woman representative in parliament for Rubanda district, re-elected for the 2nd term in office in the 2021 Uganda General elections.

She is a member of the ruling National Resistance Movement political party.

Education 
She completed her primary level education in 2000 at Rubaga Girls primary school, In 2004 Prossy completed her Uganda Certificate of Education (UCE) for lower secondary education at St Mary's secondary school. She completed her advanced secondary level known as Uganda Advanced Certification of Education (UACE) in 2007 at Hana Mixed Secondary school. In 2013,She graduated from Makerere University with a Bachelor's degree of Science in Education in Kampala.

Other responsibilities

See also 

 Parliament of Uganda.
 Member of Parliament.
 National Resistance Movement.
 List of members of the eleventh Parliament of Uganda.
 List of members of the tenth Parliament of Uganda.
 Rubanda District.

References

External links 

 Website of the Parliament of Uganda.

National Resistance Movement politicians
Women members of the Parliament of Uganda
Members of the Parliament of Uganda
Rubanda District
Makerere University alumni
Living people
21st-century Ugandan women politicians
21st-century Ugandan politicians
1987 births